is a former Japanese football player.

Tsuyuki played two seasons for the Nagoya Grampus Eight in the Japanese J1, the top flight of professional football.

He decided to retire from football on December 15, 2013(JST).

Club statistics

References

External links

1984 births
Living people
Komazawa University alumni
Association football people from Shizuoka Prefecture
Japanese footballers
J1 League players
J2 League players
Nagoya Grampus players
Tokushima Vortis players
Roasso Kumamoto players
Association football defenders